Madras Kali Bari is a Hindu temple located in the neighbourhood of West Mambalam in Chennai, India. Dedicated to the goddess Kali, the temple is constructed on the lines of the Dakhshineshwar Kali temple near Kolkata by the Bengali community in the city. Within the precincts of the temple, is a meditation hall where bhajans are sung daily. Bengali festivals like Durga Puja and Kali Puja are celebrated with grandeur.

See also
 Religion in Chennai

References 

 

Hindu temples in Chennai